Mohammad Jamal Hossain is a Bangladeshi politician and the former Member of Bangladesh Parliament of Munshiganj-3.

Career
Hossain was elected to parliament from Munshiganj-3 as a Combined opposition candidate in 1988.

References

Living people
4th Jatiya Sangsad members
Year of birth missing (living people)